Mathew Fourie (born 16 October 2002) is a South African cricketer. He made his first-class debut on 30 January 2020, for Border in the 2019–20 CSA 3-Day Provincial Cup. He made his List A debut on 7 March 2020, for Border in the 2019–20 CSA Provincial One-Day Challenge.

References

External links
 

2002 births
Living people
South African cricketers
Border cricketers
Place of birth missing (living people)